Chlorothrix is the scientific name of multiple genera and may refer to:
Chlorothrix (alga), a genus of green algae in the family Ulotrichaceae
Chlorothrix (bacteria), a Candidatus genus of bacteria
Chlorothrix (moth), a genus of insects in the family Noctuidae